Ooruku Nooruper (sometimes Oorukku Nooruper; A Hundred Voices for a Cause) is a 2003 Indian Tamil film directed by film editor B. Lenin. Based on a 1979 novel of the same name by Jayakanthan, the film focuses on Capital punishment. The film won two awards at the 49th National Film Awards, including a National Film Award for Best Feature Film in Tamil.

Plot
Balan, a young artist, becomes a part of "Ooruku Nooruper", a revolutionary organisation. To promote the ideals of the group, he becomes a modern-day Robinhood, as looting becomes an integral part of his life. Anandan, a leftist freelance writer, supports Balan and runs a campaign against capital punishment. Being a part of a revolutionary group, Balan finds no time for his family. His wife Saroja feels she is alienated from her husband. In the meanwhile, Balan accidentally kills a priest while attempting a robbery and is sentenced to death. The organisation when gets to know this, ignores him and goes on with its activities as it believes cause more important than an individual.

Cast 
Hans Kaushik as Balan
G. M. Sundar as Anandan
 Julie as Saroja
 Bharathimani as Balan's father-in-law
Archana as Anandhan's colleague
R. S. G. Chelladurai as the church father
Soori (uncredited)

Accolades

National Film Awards
 National Film Award for Best Direction – Ooruku Nooruper (2002).
 National Film Award for Best Feature Film in Tamil – Ooruku Nooruper (2002).

References

External links
http://www.nfdcindia.com/view_film.php?film_id=128&categories_id=6
BFI entry for Ooruku Nooruper

Films whose director won the Best Director National Film Award
2001 films
Films based on Indian novels
2000s Tamil-language films
Films about capital punishment
Best Tamil Feature Film National Film Award winners